Francisco Javier García Verdugo Garrido (6 July 1934 – 9 June 2017), known as García Verdugo, was a Spanish footballer who played as a defender, and manager.

External links

Stats and bio at Cadistas1910 
Stats and bio at Ciberche 

1934 births
2017 deaths
Footballers from Madrid
Spanish footballers
Association football defenders
La Liga players
Segunda División players
Tercera División players
Talavera CF players
CD Toledo players
CD Logroñés footballers
Real Zaragoza players
Xerez CD footballers
Cádiz CF players
Real Valladolid players
Valencia CF players
CE Sabadell FC footballers
Deportivo de La Coruña players
Spanish football managers
CD Tenerife managers
UD Salamanca managers
Córdoba CF managers
Gimnàstic de Tarragona managers
Rayo Vallecano managers
CA Osasuna managers
Deportivo de La Coruña managers
Real Burgos CF managers